The 2010 season was Osotspa Saraburi's 12th season in the top division of Thai football.  This article shows statistics of the club's players in the season, and also lists all matches that the club played in the season.

Team kit

Chronological list of events
10 November 2009: The Thai Premier League 2010 season first leg fixtures were announced.
11 August 2010: Osotspa Saraburi were knocked out of the FA Cup by Pattaya United in the fourth round.
24 October 2010: Osotspa Saraburi finished in 7th place in the Thai Premier League.

Current squad
As of January 25, 2010

Transfers

In

Out

League table

Results

Thai Premier League

FA Cup

Third round

Fourth round

League Cup

First round

1st Leg

2nd Leg

Second round

1st Leg

2nd Leg

Queen's Cup

References

Osotspa Saraburi F.C.
Osotspa Saraburi